The following highways are numbered 184:

Ireland
 R184 road (Ireland)

Japan
 Japan National Route 184

Poland 
  Voivodeship road 184

United States
 Interstate 184
 Alabama State Route 184
 Arkansas Highway 184
 California State Route 184
 Colorado State Highway 184
 Connecticut Route 184
 Georgia State Route 184
 Illinois Route 184
 Iowa Highway 184 (former)
 K-184 (Kansas highway)
 Kentucky Route 184
 Louisiana Highway 184
 Maine State Route 184
 M-184 (Michigan highway) (former)
 Mississippi Highway 184
 New Jersey Route 184
 New Mexico State Road 184
 New York State Route 184
 North Carolina Highway 184
 Ohio State Route 184
 Pennsylvania Route 184
 South Carolina Highway 184
 Tennessee State Route 184
 Texas State Highway 184
 Farm to Market Road 184 (Texas)
 Utah State Route 184 (1935-1963) in Provo
 Utah State Route 184 (1963-2007) in Salt Lake City (former)
 Virginia State Route 184
 Wisconsin Highway 184 (former)
Territories
 Puerto Rico Highway 184